Plataneiko is a river in the northern part of the Achaia prefecture. It is part of the Kladeos River watershed. The river flows entirely in municipalities of Rio and empties into the Gulf of Patras.

Geography
The river begins near Ano Kastritsi.  At the course of the river passes near the town of Platani where it receives the river's name, it empties into the Gulf of Corinth. The area receives water every year and during the winter, it faces floods and causes damages.

Nearby
Platani

References 

Landforms of Achaea
Rivers of Greece
Rivers of Western Greece